Penitenciaría is a station on Line 1 of the Monterrey Metro. Its location is at Rodrigo Gómez Avenue in Monterrey, near the state criminal courthouses and Topo Chico prison. The station was opened on 25 April 1991 as part of the inaugural section of Line 1, going from San Bernabé to Exposición.

This station serves the Simón Bolivar neighborhood (Colonia Simón Bolivar) and also to Valle Morelos. It is accessible for people with disabilities.

This station is named after the nearby criminal facilities and its logo represents the scale of Lady Justice.

References

Metrorrey stations
Railway stations opened in 1991
1991 establishments in Mexico